The World Ladies Championship was a golf tournament on the Ladies European Tour. It was played at the Mission Hills Haikou, China from 2012 to 2015. It moved to the Mission Hills Golf Club in Shenzhen in 2016 and returned to Haikou in 2017. It was played as both an individual and team tournament. Only the individual event was an official money/official win event.

Tournament names through the years:
2012: World Ladies Championship
2013–2014: Mission Hills World Ladies Championship
2015–2016: World Ladies Championship
2017: SGF67 World Ladies Championship with SBS

Winners

References

External links
Coverage on the Ladies European Tour's official site

Former Ladies European Tour events
LPGA of Korea Tour events
Golf tournaments in China
Sports competitions in Guangdong
Sport in Hainan
Sport in Shenzhen
Recurring sporting events established in 2012
Recurring sporting events disestablished in 2017
2012 establishments in China
2017 disestablishments in China